The Winter Hawk EP is an EP by the indie rock band Elf Power.  It is a five-track EP originally released on 7" vinyl, and later included on the CD release of Vainly Clutching at Phantom Limbs.

Track listing
 "Grand Intrusion Call"
 "Monster Surprise"
 "Heroes and Insects"
 "The Winter Hawk"
 "Exalted Exit Wound"

1996 EPs
Elf Power albums